Dutton is a community in the Township of Dutton/Dunwich, Elgin County, Ontario, Canada.

Originally part of Dunwich Township, Dutton was originally called Bennettville, then Lisgar.  When the Canada Southern Railway was built in 1872, the station was named Dutton Station after the railway's civil engineer.  It was shortened to Dutton in 1881 and incorporated as a separate municipality a few years later.

In 1998, as part of county-wide municipal restructuring, the Village of Dutton was reamalgamated with Dunwich to form Dutton-Dunwich.

Communities in Elgin County
Former villages in Ontario
Populated places disestablished in 1998